San Valley Landscape Park (Park Krajobrazowy Doliny Sanu) is a protected area (Landscape Park) in south-eastern Poland, established in 1992, covering an area of .

The Park lies within Podkarpackie Voivodeship: in Bieszczady County (Gmina Czarna, Gmina Lutowiska) and Lesko County (Gmina Solina).

Within the Landscape Park are three nature reserves.

In addition, several nature and landscape complexes were created here: "Wieś Krywe", "Village of Smolnik", "Cerkiew in Hulskie", "Młyn in Hulskie", "Cemetery in Stuposiany", "Cemetery in Ruskie", and in the vicinity of the Park also "Młyn in Dwernik”.

References

San Valley
Parks in Podkarpackie Voivodeship